Danielewski (feminine: Danielewska; plural: Danielewscy) is a Polish-language surname derived from the given name Daniel. Notable people with this surname include:

 Poe (singer), born Annie Danielewski (born 1968), American musician
 Mark Z. Danielewski (born 1966), American fiction author
  (1932–2004), Polish writer and translator 
 Tad Danielewski (1921–1993), American film director

See also
 

Polish-language surnames